Lisa Shaw can refer to:

Lisa Shaw (musician), a Canadian musician
Lisa Shaw (broadcaster) (1976–2021), a BBC radio personality
Lisa Fowler, a fictional character from the series EastEnders also known as Lisa Shaw